Bangshi River (also spelt Bansi) is an important river in central Bangladesh. It originates in Jamalpur, from the course of the old Brahmaputra  and flows past the Madhupur tract. It flows through Tangail and meets the Tongi in Ghazipur. It passes near Jatiyo Smriti Soudho in Savar and falls into the Dhaleshwari. Louhajang is a tributary of the Bangshi. Dhamrai on the banks of the Bangshi is famous for its muslin weaving.

Turag-Bangshi River basin
A report on wetland protection and enhancement says, “The Turag-Bangshi floodplain is located in Kaliakair Upazila of Gazipur District. Upstream the basin is connected via the Dhaleswari-Pungli River to the greater Jamuna floodplain, and downstream it is connected through the Tongi River with the Buriganga-Meghna River system. The Upper Turag-Lower Bangshi is the main source of water in the region and flows through the site. All associated beels and other floodplain areas are connected to the main river through a series of khals and other channels. This is a deeply flooded area in the low-red soil plateau of Madhupur tract. The floodplain 
is inundated when water flows over the banks of the Turag-Bangshi river making all the low areas become a connected sheet of water in the monsoon. By late November, most of the water recedes and boro rice is planted in almost all of the low-lying areas. During the rainy season the water area is about 43 km² while in the dry season the water area becomes less than 7 km². About 2,68,900 people live in this area with 84% of households being involved in fishing, and 15 % of households are full time fishers.”

A bazar nayar hat situated at bank while the famous pottery village pal para is also situated on south side of Bangshi.

References

External links
 

Rivers of Bangladesh
Rivers of Dhaka Division